Ries is the 10th district of the Austrian city of Graz. It is named after a hill range in it. Ries borders the districts of Mariatrost and Geidorf to the west, and St. Leonhard and Waltendorf to the south. The postal codes of Ries are 8010, 8044 and 8047.
The Roman Catholic Bruder-Klaus church, finished in 1987, is situated within the district.

References

External links
 Political profile at Graz.at (in German)